Lady Sinjuwon of the Sincheon Gang clan was the daughter of Gang Gi-ju who became the 23rd wife of Taejo of Goryeo. Through her father, she was a descendant of Gang Bo-jeon (강보전) who was the great-grandson of Gang Ho-gyeong (강호경) and grandson of Gang Chung (강충). Gang was also the uncle of Queen Jeonghwa; who was the great-grandmother of King Taejo Yi Seonggye Wang Geon, her husband.

They initially had a son, but died to early after birth and she then raised Queen Sinmyeong's 4th son, Wang So and also adopted him like her own son, who later became the 4th monarch of Goryeo, Gwangjong. Wang So later married his own younger half sister, Queen Sinjeong's daughter which later known as Queen Daemok. There is a speculation that Gang, who was from Hwangju, may have helped her in marrying Wang So as Gang’s and Daemok’s clan both came from the Hwangju region. This may have been the basis for Wang So's accession.

References

External links
Lady Sinjuwon on Encykorea .

Year of birth unknown
Year of death unknown
Consorts of Taejo of Goryeo
People from South Hwanghae